Rosemont, New Jersey may refer to:

Rosemont, Hunterdon County, New Jersey
Rosemont, Mercer County, New Jersey